Pontamau is a small island off the coast of Ayeyarwady Region, Burma.

Geography
Pontamau is 0.6 km long and 0.3 km wide. It is separated from the mainland coast by a 0.75 km wide sound.
  
The island is wooded and rises to a height of 54 m. It is fringed with reefs and lies about 5 km west of Bomie Bay.

Nearby islands
Myauk island is a small islet 0.8 km to the northeast of Pontamau's northeastern point.

See also
List of islands of Burma

References 

Islands of Myanmar
Ayeyarwady Region